The Now Tour was the fourth headlining concert tour by Canadian recording artist Shania Twain, in support of her fifth studio album Now (2017). The tour began on May 3, 2018, in Tacoma, and was initially scheduled to conclude in Las Vegas on August 4, 2018 but was later extended to conclude in Dunedin on December 22, 2018. The tour marks Twain's first since 2015's Rock This Country Tour, which, at the time, Twain announced would be her final run out on the road.

Background 
During an interview with ET Canada, on June 29, 2017, Twain stated that she had a change of heart and was ready to hit the road again to support her upcoming album, Now, stating "Now that I've got new music, I'm really motivated to do that music live".

On August 16, 2017, while appearing on The Tonight Show, host Jimmy Fallon announced that Twain will be embarking on the Now Tour in 2018. The following day on August 17, 2017, Twain confirmed that she will be going on tour to support her upcoming album Now, through social media with tickets going on sale the following week.

Following on from various promotional appearances for Now in the UK, including an exclusive set at Radio 2 Live in Hyde Park, Twain announced the UK/Ireland dates on September 20, 2017. Revealing her excitement over her tour news, Shania said, "It's time to get back out there and give the music a chance to live a life!" Tickets for shows in Dublin and Belfast sold out within minutes, prompting Twain to add a second Dublin show. Additional dates for both Glasgow and London were announced after tickets for the initial dates quickly sold out. Due to demand, extra dates were added for Brisbane, Melbourne, Sydney and Auckland. An additional concert for New Zealand was added for December 22 in Dunedin after the first two in Auckland sold out.

On February 26, 2018, she was announced as headliner for the Festa do Peão de Barretos, her first concert in Brazil. Negotiations for this to happen took over 20 years and Twain was paid over 1.1 million to perform for 55,000 fans who came from multiple countries of South America.

At the end of 2018, the tour placed at number 34 on Pollstar's "2018 Year-End Top 100 Worldwide Tours" list, estimating that it grossed $51.5 million and that 596,972 people attended throughout the year.  In July 2019, Pollstar ranked the tour on number 69 at the Mid Year Top 100 Worldwide Tours 2019 with $8.5 million and 74,533 of tickets sold in 7 shows.

Overall according to Pollstar, the tour grossed $60 million in 59 dates for a total attendance of 671,505 people in an average of 11,381 fans per concert paying $100.40 dollars for each ticket. According to Touring Data, which combines published and non-published boxscores in Pollstar and Billboard magazine, the tour had an estimated gross of $76 million in 76 dates and 860,000 tickets sold worldwide.

The tour is the best-selling tour for a country female artist in 2018 and the seventh best-selling for a female artist overall in the same year. The Now Tour helped secure Twain's place as the second highest-grossing country female artist in the decade with over $190 million collected, only behind Taylor Swift.

Critical reception 
The tour opened to positive critical reception. Fish Griwkowsky of the Edmonton Journal called the tour Twain's best, while Matt Olsen of the StarPhoenix complimented the show saying it was "filled with extravagance and punctuated with genuine emotion".

Opening acts
On April 11, 2018, Swiss singer Bastian Baker confirmed he would be the opening act for all of the tour's 77 dates. Baker previously opened for Twain on the final two dates of her 2015 Rock This Country Tour.

The Shires joined Twain and Baker for the UK and Ireland dates.

Set list 
This set list is representative of the show on May 3, 2018, at Tacoma Dome in Tacoma, Washington. It is not representative of all concerts for the duration of the tour.

 "Life's About to Get Good"
 "Come on Over"
 "Up!"
 "Poor Me"
 "Don't Be Stupid (You Know I Love You)"
 "That Don't Impress Me Much"
 "Let's Kiss and Make Up"
 "Any Man of Mine"
 "Whose Bed Have Your Boots Been Under?"
 "Honey, I'm Home"
 "I'm Alright"
 "Soldier"
 "You're Still the One"
 "More Fun"
 "The Woman in Me" 
 "From This Moment On"
 "I'm Gonna Getcha Good!"
 "Party for Two"
 "Swingin' with My Eyes Closed"
 "(If You're Not in It for Love) I'm Outta Here!"
 "Man! I Feel Like a Woman!"
 "Rock This Country!"

Additional Notes

"Rock This Country!" was cut from the set list beginning with the July 27 Denver show.
"Let's Kiss and Make Up" was cut from the set list beginning with the August 1 Fresno show.
 Brazil's show was set with no moving cubes and a slight change to set list.
 "Soldier" was cut from the set list beginning with the September 19 Glasgow show.
 "Soldier" was replaced by an interlude of "Ka-Ching!" performed by the backup dancers and singers for the Europe leg of the tour.
 For the Europe leg, no encore number(s) were performed, and the final song is "Man! I Feel Like a Woman!"

Shows

References 

2018 concert tours
Shania Twain concert tours